"Everybody Go" is a single by Japanese boy band Kis-My-Ft2. It was released on August 10, 2011. It debuted in number one on the weekly Oricon Singles Chart and reached number one on the Billboard Japan Hot 100. It was the 10th best-selling single in Japan in 2011, with 441,680 copies.

References 

2011 singles
2011 songs
Japanese-language songs
Kis-My-Ft2 songs
Oricon Weekly number-one singles
Billboard Japan Hot 100 number-one singles
Japanese television drama theme songs
Song articles with missing songwriters